Virginia's 29th House of Delegates district elects one of 100 seats in the Virginia House of Delegates, the lower house of the state's bicameral legislature. District 29 represents the city of Winchester as well as parts of Frederick and Warren counties. The seat is currently held by Bill Wiley, who was elected in a November 3, 2020 special election.

District officeholders

Electoral history

References

Winchester, Virginia
Frederick County, Virginia
Warren County, Virginia
Virginia House of Delegates districts